On 24 August 2011, Nordic Regional Airlines (known as Flybe Nordic at the time) announced its first 24 routes, including both former Finncomm routes as well as new ones. Since October 2012 Nordic Regional Airlines has operated around one third of Finnair's European network under Finnair's callsign, AY. From 1 May 2015, the airline has operated solely under Finnair's flight code. As of 2017, Norra doesn't have its own commercial routes. The airline operates flights on behalf of Finnair only.

Destinations

 Austria
 Vienna (Vienna Airport) (AY)
 Belgium
 Brussels (Brussels Airport) (AY)
 Estonia
 Tallinn (Lennart Meri Tallinn Airport) (AY)
 Finland
  Helsinki (Helsinki Airport) (AY) Base
 Joensuu (Joensuu Airport) (AY)
 Jyväskylä (Jyväskylä Airport)
 Kajaani (Kajaani Airport)
 Kemi (Kemi-Tornio Airport)
 Kittilä (Kittilä Airport) (AY) Seasonal
 Kokkola (Kokkola-Pietarsaari Airport)
 Kuopio (Kuopio Airport) (AY)
 Kuusamo (Kuusamo Airport) (AY) Seasonal
 Mariehamn (Mariehamn Airport)
 Oulu (Oulu Airport) (AY)
 Tampere (Tampere-Pirkkala Airport) (AY)
 Turku (Turku Airport) (AY)
 Vaasa (Vaasa Airport) (AY)
 France
 Paris (Paris-Charles de Gaulle Airport) (AY)
 Germany
 Berlin (Tegel Airport) (AY)
 Düsseldorf (Düsseldorf Airport) (AY)
 Frankfurt (Frankfurt Airport) (AY)
 Hamburg (Hamburg Airport) (AY)
 Munich (Munich Airport) (AY)
 Hungary
 Budapest (Budapest Airport) (AY)
 Ireland
 Dublin (Dublin Airport) (AY)
 Latvia
 Riga (Riga Airport) (AY)
 Lithuania
 Vilnius (Vilnius Airport) (AY)
 Norway
 Oslo (Oslo Airport, Gardermoen) (AY)
 Poland
 Gdańsk (Gdańsk Lech Wałęsa Airport) (AY)
 Warsaw (Warsaw Chopin Airport) (AY)
 Russia
 Kazan (AY)
 Nizhny Novgorod (AY)
 Saint Petersburg - Pulkovo Airport (AY)
 Samara (AY)
 Sweden
 Gothenburg (Göteborg Landvetter Airport) (AY)
 Luleå (Luleå Airport) (AY)
 Norrköping (Norrköping Airport)
 Stockholm (Stockholm-Arlanda Airport) (AY)
 Stockholm (Stockholm-Bromma Airport) (AY)
 Visby (Visby Airport)
 Switzerland
 Geneva (Geneva Airport) (AY)
 Zurich (Zurich Airport) (AY)
 United Kingdom
 Manchester (Manchester Airport) (AY)
 Edinburgh  (Edinburgh Airport)  (AY)

Terminated Destinations
 Estonia
 Tartu (Tartu Airport)
 Finland
 Kajaani (Kajaani Airport)
 Enontekiö (Enontekiö Airport)
 Varkaus (Varkaus Airport)
 Norway
 Trondheim (Trondheim Airport, Værnes)
 Sweden
 Skellefteå (Skellefteå Airport)

References

Finnair
Nordic Regional Airlines